Altai State Medical University is a public university in Barnaul, Russia. The university was known as Altai State Medical Institute until 1994. Altai State Medical University is located in the West Siberian part of the country. It is functioned by more than 60 departments and has seven faculties.

History
It was founded by the Council of Ministers of the RSFSR in 1954.  ASMU was known as the Altai State Medical Institute until 1994.

Rankings and reputation
Altai State Medical University is ranked 5122 in the 4icu world university ranking

Education and student life
At present, international students from 19 countries study here at Altai State Medical University. Out of them, 600 are from India only. Rest are from Iraq, Egypt, Syria, Nigeria, Afghanistan, Mongolia, China, Kazakhstan, Kyrgyzstan, Tajikistan, Uzbekistan, Ukraine, Azerbaijan, and other countries.

Recognition of Altai State Medical University 

 World Health Organization (WHO)
 National Medical Commission (NMC)
 The Ministry of Education and Science of the Russian Federation.
 World Federation for Medical Education (WFME)
 Educational Commission for Foreign Medical Graduates (ECFMG)
 The Foundation for Advancement of International Medical Education and Research (FAIMER)

Faculties
The university has seven faculties:
 General medicine (Лечебный)
 Pediatrics (Педиатрический)
 Pharmaceutics (Фармацевтический)
 Stomatology (Стоматологический)
 Hygiene and disease prevention (Медико-профилактический)
 Nursing (Высшего сестринского образования)
 Further vocational education (Повышения квалификации)

See also 

 List of medical university in Russia

Sources 
 Official website

References

1954 establishments in Russia
Education in Barnaul
Educational institutions established in 1954
Public universities and colleges in Russia
Medical schools in Russia
Universities and institutes established in the Soviet Union
Universities in Altai Krai
Cultural heritage monuments in Altai Krai
Objects of cultural heritage of Russia of regional significance